Kurt Adams (born July 10, 1987) was a Canadian football wide receiver who played for the Winnipeg Blue Bombers of the Canadian Football League. After being on the practice squad of the Blue Bombers in 2011, Adams was moved to the active roster in 2012 and played in two regular season games. He caught three passes for 19 yards.

References 

American football wide receivers
Canadian football wide receivers
Harding Bisons football players
Winnipeg Blue Bombers players
1987 births
Players of Canadian football from Arkansas
Players of American football from Arkansas
Living people
People from Searcy, Arkansas